Apache Rifles is a 1964 American Western film directed by William Witney and starring Audie Murphy. The film was shot at Bronson Canyon and Red Rock Canyon State Park, California. It was the first of four Audie Murphy films for producer Grant Whylock's Admiral Pictures.

Plot
Captain Stanton is a renowned Indian Fighter with his animosity stirred by the fact that his career officer father was forced to resign after trusting a group of Indians who broke their word to him. Stanton is sent to the field to relieve the commander of a troop unsuccessfully hunting Apaches who have fled their reservation. Stanton quickly meets with success by having his new troop drop their excess equipment to move faster and longer. He defeats a war party of Apache by luring them with an unescorted wagon loaded with hidden soldiers who engage the enemy until Stanton's mounted troop surround and defeat them. Stanton captures Red Hawk, the son of Chief Victorio and uses him to negotiate a truce with the Apaches promising to stay on their reservation in return for white miners not trespassing on their land to mine gold.

Though the territory remains peaceful, the economy of the settlers and miners faces a serious economic threat when the miners are unable to pay the business interests that advance them money for their mines in return for a percentage of the profits.

Captain Stanton's sympathies gradually change when the miners continue their trespassing. He also is attracted to Dawn Gillis, a courageous missionary teacher who is half Indian herself, and teaches in an Indian school. Stanton ruins his military career by beating up a local troublemaker who makes racist taunts to Dawn, then later engages a group of whites who massacre a group of Indians at the school that leads Stanton to open fire on the whites killing several of them.

A delegation complains about Stanton's behaviour and the economic disaster to the Federal Government in Washington D.C. who send out a new commander named Colonel Perry. The Colonel not only relieves Stanton but dismantles his line of outposts to monitor white entry into the reservation that leads the miners to swarm in and hostilities to resume.

Victorio's Apaches lure the inexperienced Colonel and his men into an ambush but a messenger escapes to the remnants of the Colonel's command of which Stanton takes charge to straighten out the mess.

Cast

References

External links

 
 Apache Rifles at TCMDB

1964 films
Audie Murphy
1964 Western (genre) films
20th Century Fox films
American Western (genre) films
Western (genre) cavalry films
Films set in Arizona
Films shot in Los Angeles
Films directed by William Witney
Films scored by Richard LaSalle
1960s English-language films
Revisionist Western (genre) films
1960s American films
Films with screenplays by Richard Schayer